is a Japanese OVA series released from 1985 to 1992. Rem Ayanokōji is a "dream hunter", a person capable of entering the dreams of sleeping people and fighting the demons causing nightmares. The stories have their base in supernatural and standard horror, with action scenes and mystery thrown in. The pilot episode was originally animated by Aubec and released as a side project OVA which contained a short episode. Due to high popularity, the production team decided to release subsequent videos into the anime market. The pilot episode was later re-released as "Special Version", removing all pornographic scenes and adding nearly 30 minutes of new footage made by Anime R.

Characters

While appearing to be a typical junior high school age girl, Rem's age is unclear and her family situation unknown, and she never discusses these matters. Rem has the psychic ability to enter the dreams of other individuals. She is a descendant of a long line of people with the ability to be "Dream Guardians," those who hunt down the demons who try to steal the life force of humans by invading their dreams. She makes her living as a private detective investigating supernatural matters. Her headquarters, the Ayanokōji Detective Agency, is located on a side street off Aoyama in Tokyo. As her investigations are limited to supernatural and bizarre phenomenon, her advertising is limited to word of mouth from grateful clients.

 and Sanae Miyuki
Rem's pet kitten, who also acts as support by transforming into a large wild cat during confrontations with Rem's opponents.

Rem's pet puppy, who acts as support by transforming into a large wild dog when needed. Beta has the ability to track ghosts and spirits.

A mysterious ascetic monk who, while unable to enter dreams and confront dream demons there, he is able to offer strong assistance when Rem is fighting outside the dream world. He has very powerful abilities due to his strong faith. In the real world, he is able to use powerful martial arts techniques in order to fight the demons in their true form. He also has strong feelings of love toward Rem.

 An inspector from police headquarters. He became acquainted with Rem during a demon nightmare incident involving his daughter Yukari. While he was decorated for meritorious service during the incident, he has come to think of himself as incompetent and been involved in many bizarre occurrences.

 A dedicated student of psychology, and assistant professor at Genjōsai University, Kidō is also a computer expert. He also has strong romantic feelings toward Rem, and frequently battles Enkō for her attention.
 / 

His real name is Shimura (死夢羅), and he has the same Dream Guardian ancestors as Rem. However, he uses his power in order to murder people in their dreams.
Tokiko Ozu

Saeko Asuka

Yōko Takamiya

Kyōko Takamiya
 and Kei Tomiyama
Kyoko is Yoko's twin sister, Yoko states Kyoko was mature and outgoing, unlike her. Kyoko fought back against Saeko, Yoko told her that they couldn't compete with Saeko's beauty. Everyone began to hate Kyoko, Yumi, Hiroko and Akane bullied Kyoko. Saeko punished Kyoko with a rose whip and locked her in a room in the Clock Tower.
Akemi Katsuragi

Elizabeth

Sources:

Releases

OVAs

CDs
Dream Hunter Rem Original Soundtrack: Special (King Records, K30X-7102, December 21, 1987)
Dream Hunter Rem: Dennō Kūiki no Meiro (King Records, K30X-7140, October 21, 1988)
Dream Hunter Rem: Minami Azabu Mahō Club (King Records, 276A-7003, April 21, 1989)
New Dream Hunter Rem Image Album: Yume no Kishi-tachi (Meldac, MECH-30001, November 21, 1990)
New Dream Hunter Rem Voice Movie: Yume no Kishi-tachi (Meldac, MECH-30004, January 21, 1991)
New Dream Hunter Rem: Sōtō no Mercedes (Cyclone, CYCC-10002, April 25, 1992)
New Dream Hunter Rem Voice Movie: Satsuriku no Labyrinth (Cyclone, CYCC-10005, September 25, 1992)

DVDs
Dream Hunter Rem DVD-BOX 1 (Only Hearts, OHK-0028, November 22, 2006)
Dream Hunter Rem DVD-BOX 2 (Only Hearts, OHK-0035, May 23, 2007)

Novels
Dream Hunter Rem V: Yume Circus Bishōjo Jigokuhen (written by Seiji Okuda, art by Kazuaki Mōri, Tokuma Communications, October 1989)
Dream Hunter Rem: Floyd-jō Genmutan  (written by Yoh Yuki, art by Kazuaki Mōri, Keibunsha, January 30, 1992)

Comics 
Dream Hunter Rem XX (Kill Time Communication, 2009)
Dream Hunter Rem Alternative (Kill Time Communication, 2011)

Anthology comics
Party of Rem (Rapport, January 20, 1991)
Fiesta of Rem (Rapport, August 20, 1992)

Books
Dream Hunter Rem I (Tokuma Communications, December 10, 1987)
Dream Hunter Rem II (Tokuma Communications, April 10, 1988)
Dream Hunter Rem III (Tokuma Communications, July 20, 1988)
Dream Hunter Rem SP (Tokuma Communications, March 31, 1990)

Additional release sources:

In other media
Rem appears as a playable character in the PlayStation 3 and PlayStation Vita simulation RPG, Super Heroine Chronicle.

See also
 Dimension Hunter Fandora, a similar anime OVA trilogy released in the same year

Notes

Japanese titles

References

External links
  Dream Hunter Rem Official Website
 

1985 anime OVAs
1990 anime OVAs
Dreams in fiction
Girls with guns anime and manga
Seinen manga
Supernatural thriller anime and manga